Retizafra is a genus of sea snails, marine gastropod mollusks in the family Columbellidae, the dove snails.

Species
Species within the genus Retizafra include:
 Retizafra brevilata K. Monsecour & D. Monsecour, 2016 
 Retizafra bulbacea K. Monsecour & D. Monsecour, 2016 
 Retizafra calva (Verco, 1910)
 Retizafra cryptheliae K. Monsecour & D. Monsecour, 2016 
 Retizafra decussata (Lussi, 2002)
 Retizafra dentilabia (Lussi, 2009)
 Retizafra gemmulifera (Hedley, 1907)
 Retizafra helenae K. Monsecour & D. Monsecour, 2018
 Retizafra hordeum K. Monsecour & D. Monsecour, 2016 
 Retizafra intricata (Hedley, 1912)
 Retizafra macumae Hoffman, K. Monsecour & Freiwald, 2019
 Retizafra meyeri K. Monsecour & D. Monsecour, 2018
 Retizafra mitromorpha K. Monsecour & D. Monsecour, 2016 
 Retizafra multicostata (May, 1911)
 † Retizafra oligomiocaenica Lozouet, 1999 
 Retizafra oryza K. Monsecour & D. Monsecour, 2016 
 Retizafra plexa (Hedley, 1902) 
 † Retizafra rissoides (Grateloup, 1834) 
 Retizafra rotundata K. Monsecour & D. Monsecour, 2016 
 Retizafra salvati K. Monsecour & D. Monsecour, 2018
 Retizafra tamxatensis Hoffman, K. Monsecour & Freiwald, 2019
 † Retizafra toreuma Maxwell, 1988 
 Retizafra tuamotuensis K. Monsecour & D. Monsecour, 2018
 Retizafra valae (Lussi, 2009)
 Retizafra zingiber K. Monsecour & D. Monsecour, 2016 
Species brought into synonymy
 Retizafra fasciata Bozzetti, 2009: synonym of Engina fasciata (Bozzetti, 2009)

References

Mémoires du Muséum national d'Histoire naturelle 208: 291-362

External links
 C. (1913) Studies on Australian Mollusca, part XI. Proceedings of the Linnean Society of New South Wales, 38, 258–339, pls. 16–19

Columbellidae